Dram or DRAM may refer to:

Technology and engineering
 Dram (unit), a unit of mass and volume, and an informal name for a small amount of liquor, especially whisky or whiskey
 Dynamic random-access memory, a type of electronic semiconductor memory
 Dram, Welsh term for a minecart, a small railway cargo truck used in a mine railway

Other uses
 Armenian dram, a monetary unit
Armenian dram sign
Artsakh dram (formerly Nagorno-Karabakh dram), a monetary unit
 Database of Recorded American Music, an online resource
 Shelley FKA DRAM (Shelley Marshaun Massenburg-Smith, born 1988), formerly known as DRAM, American rapper and actor
 Zhangmu (Dram in Tibetan), a town on the Nepal-Tibet border
 Historic English name for Drammen, Norway

See also
 Dram shop, a bar, tavern or similar commercial establishment where alcoholic beverages are sold
 Dirham, a unit of currency, derived from the dram unit of mass 
 The Drams, an American band made up of members of Slobberbone